The Mismatch is a 1979 Australian television film about a separated couple. It screened on the ABC as part of a Season of Plays. Others in the series included:
Burn the Butterflies
Gail
Money in the Bank
The Rook Pool
Banana Bender.

Premise
Marsha and Richard Harrington have separated but agree that Richard should move back home for the sake of their two daughters (he is an actor, she is a teacher). Their plans to lead separate lives proves difficult. She starts dating school teacher Courtney, he starts dating his producer's wife.  Courtney is revealed to be corrupt and the wife has Richard fired from his series. Richard and Marsha eventually reconcile.

Cast
Jane Harders
Stephen O'Rourke
Margo Lee
Michael Aitkens 		
Alfred Bell 		
John Bluthal
Michael Caulfield 		
Jennifer Claire 		
Nerida Clark 		
Bronwyn Clarke 		
George Shevtsov

References

External links

The Mismatch at Screen Australia

Australian television films
1979 television films
1979 films
Films directed by Ken Hannam
1970s English-language films